The abolition of slavery occurred at different times in different countries. It frequently occurred sequentially in more than one stage – for example, as abolition of the trade in slaves in a specific country, and then as abolition of slavery throughout empires. Each step was usually the result of a separate law or action. This timeline shows abolition laws or actions listed chronologically. It also covers the abolition of serfdom.

Although slavery is technically illegal in all countries today, the practice continues in many locations around the world, primarily in Africa, Asia, and Eastern Europe, often with government support.

Ancient times

During classical antiquity, several prominent societies in Europe and the ancient Near East regulated enslavement for debt and the related but distinct practice of debt bondage (in which a creditor could extract compulsory labor from a debtor in repayment of their debt, but the debtor was not formally enslaved and was not subject to all the conditions of chattel slavery, such as being perpetually owned, sellable on the open market, or stripped of kinship).

Reforms listed below such as the laws of Solon in Athens, the Lex Poetelia Papiria in Republican Rome, or rules set forth in the Hebrew Bible in the Book of Deuteronomy generally regulated the supply of slaves and debt-servants by forbidding or regulating the bondage of certain privileged groups (thus, the Roman reforms protected Roman citizens, the Athenian reforms protected Athenian citizens, and the rules in Deuteronomy guaranteed freedom to a Hebrew after a fixed duration of servitude), but none abolished slavery, and even what protections were instituted did not apply to foreigners or noncitizen subjects.

Medieval times

N.B.: Many of the listed reforms were reversed over succeeding centuries.

1500–1700

1701–1799

1800–1829

1830–1849

1850–1899

1900–1949

1950–1999

2000–present

Notes

See also

Abolitionism
History of slavery
List of abolitionist forerunners (by Thomas Clarkson)
Reparations for slavery
Slave Trade Acts
Sexual slavery
Slavery at common law
Slavery in modern Africa
Slavery in the 21st century
Timeline of the civil rights movement

References

Further reading
 Campbell, Gwyn. The Structure of Slavery in Indian Ocean Africa and Asia (Frank Cass, 2004)
 Davis, David Brion. Inhuman Bondage: The Rise and Fall of Slavery in the New World (2008) excerpt
 Drescher, Seymour. Abolition: A History of Slavery and Antislavery (Cambridge University Press, 2009)
 Drescher, Seymour. Pathways from slavery: British and colonial mobilizations in global perspective (Routledge, 2018).
 Drescher, Seymour. "Civil Society and Paths to Abolition." Journal of Global Slavery 1.1 (2016): 44–71.
 Finkelman, Paul, and Joseph Miller, eds. Macmillan Encyclopedia of World Slavery (2 vol 1998)
 Finkelman, Paul, and Seymour Drescher. "The eternal problem of slavery in international law: Killing the vampire of human culture." Michigan State Law Review (2017): 755+ online.
 Gordon, M. Slavery in the Arab World (1989)
 Grindal, Peter. Opposing the Slavers; The Royal Navy's Campaign against the Atlantic Slave Trade (L.B. Tauris 2016) 
  Hinks, Peter, and John McKivigan, eds. Encyclopedia of Antislavery and Abolition (2 vol. 2007) 795pp; 
 Lovejoy, Paul. Transformations in Slavery: A History of Slavery in Africa (Cambridge UP, 1983)
 Mathews, Nathaniel. "The 'Fused Horizon' of Abolitionism and Islam: Historicism, the Quran and the Global History of Abolition." Journal of global slavery 4.2 (2019): 226–265.
 Morgan, Kenneth. Slavery and the British Empire: From Africa to America (2008)
 Rodriguez, Junius P., ed. The Historical Encyclopedia of World Slavery (1997)
 Rodriguez, Junius P., ed. Encyclopedia of Emancipation and Abolition in the Transatlantic World (2007)
 Sinha, Manisha. "The Problem of Abolition in the Age of Capitalism The Problem of Slavery in the Age of Revolution, 1770–1823, by David Brion Davis." American Historical Review 124.1 (2019): 144–163.

External links
 Timeline – What happened before 1807? The Royal Naval Museum
 Timeline – What happened after 1807? The Royal Naval Museum
 Slavery and Abolition
 American Abolitionists and Antislavery Activists, comprehensive list of abolitionist and anti-slavery activists and organizations in the United States, including US and international anti-slavery timelines.

Abolitionism
History of slavery
Abolition of slavery and serfdom